Sofia El Marikh (  Moroccan pronunciation: ; born ), also spelled Sophia El Mareekh, is a musician and entertainer from Casablanca, Morocco. She was a contestant on Star Academy I.

Discography

Albums 

 Kelmet Hobb 2007
 Tahwak 2011

Singles 

 Tahwak (She Adores You)
 Nmout 3lik (I Love You till Death)
 Es'alni Ana (Ask Me)
 Bezzaf Bezaf (a lot, a lot)
 Baheb Feek (What I Love about You)
 Kelmet Hobb (Word of Love)

Videography 

 "Tahwak" – Wissam Smayra
 "Es'alni Ana" – Wissam Smayra
 "Baheb Feek" – Randa Alam
 "Kelmet hobb" – Laila Kanaan

References

Social media 
 Facebook

1981 births
Living people
People from Casablanca
21st-century Moroccan women singers
Singers who perform in Classical Arabic
Contestants from Arabic singing competitions